is a 1964 Japanese jidaigeki film written and directed by Kaneto Shindo. The film is set during a civil war in the fifteenth century. Nobuko Otowa and Jitsuko Yoshimura play two women who kill soldiers to steal their possessions, and Kei Satō plays the man who ultimately comes between them.

Plot
The film is set somewhere in Japan near Kyoto, in the mid-fifteenth century during the violent outbreak of the Onin War and the beginnings of the civilly turbulent Sengoku Jidai. Two fleeing soldiers are ambushed in a large field of tall, thick reeds and murdered by an older woman and her young daughter-in-law. The two women loot the dead soldiers, strip them of their armour and weapons, and drop the bodies in a deep pit hidden in the field. The next day, they take the armor and weapons to a merchant named Ushi and trade them for food. The merchant tells them news of the war, which is driving people across the country to desperation. As they leave, Ushi makes a sexual proposition to the older woman, who rebuffs him. A neighbor named Hachi, who has been at war, returns. The two women ask about Kishi, who was both the older woman's son and younger woman's husband, and was drafted along with Hachi. Hachi tells them that they deserted the war and that Kishi was later killed when they were caught stealing food from farmers. The older woman warns the younger woman to stay away from Hachi, whom she blames for her son's death.

Hachi begins to show interest in the younger woman and, despite being warned to stay away from Hachi, she is seduced by him. She begins to sneak out every night to run to his hut and have sex. The older woman learns of the relationship and is both angry and jealous. She tries to seduce Hachi herself, but is coldly rebuffed. She then pleads with him to not take her daughter-in-law away, since she cannot kill and rob passing soldiers without her help.

One night, while Hachi and the younger woman are together, a lost samurai wearing a Hannya mask forces the older woman to guide him out of the field. He claims to wear the mask to protect his incredibly handsome face from harm. She tricks him into plunging to his death in the pit where the women dispose of their victims. She climbs down and steals the samurai's possessions and, with great difficulty, his mask, revealing the samurai's horribly disfigured face.

At night, as the younger woman goes to see Hachi, the older woman blocks her path, wearing the samurai's robes and hannya mask, frightening the girl into running home. During the day, the older woman further convinces the younger woman that the "demon" was real, as punishment for her affair with Hachi. The younger woman avoids Hachi during the day, but continues to try and see him at night. During a storm, the older woman again terrifies the younger woman with the mask, but Hachi, tired of being ignored, finds the younger woman and has sex with her in the grass as her mother-in-law watches. The older woman realizes that despite all her warnings, her daughter-in-law wants to be with Hachi. Hachi returns to his hut, where he discovers another deserter stealing his food; the deserter abruptly grabs his spear and stabs Hachi, killing him.

The older woman discovers that, after getting wet in the rain, the mask is impossible to remove. She reveals her scheme to her daughter-in-law and pleads for her to help take off the mask. The younger woman agrees to remove the mask after the older woman promises not to interfere with her relationship with Hachi. After failing to pull it off, the young woman breaks off the mask with a mallet. Under the mask, the older woman's face is now disfigured, as the samurai's had been. It is implied that the mask was cursed by supernatural means, binding itself to its wearer’s face, but the truth behind the origin is never revealed. The younger woman, thinking her mother-in-law has turned into a demon, flees; the older woman runs after her, crying out that she is a human being, not a demon. The young woman leaps over the pit, and as the older woman leaps after her, the film ends.

Themes

While Onibaba is said to gain its inspiration from the Shin Buddhist parable by Kaneto Shizawa's discretion, onibaba also refers to traditional tall tales and ghost stories throughout Japan of vicious and monstrous elderly demon women said to stalk about various areas and wilderness to hunt for human victims to take back to their lairs and feast on them. This can be seen through how both the mother and daughter in law lurk about their home territory of the fen which they live in, awaiting stragglers and lost soldiers of war before killing them for their valuables in order to purchase and gather food in their desperate times. It is of some consideration that such tales of evildoings of men in such times may be the inspiration for how such tales may have been started in the first place, as such atrociousness would in turn not be accepted by any normal human being as possible by men. In terms of Japanese spirituality and Shinto, there are also themes of how gross vice and evil can eventually turn one into demons and monsters themselves in time, which is catalyzed by the mother wearing the cursed mask, which itself may be cursed or afflicted with a severe infectious disease, transforming her into a literal onibaba. 

With the outbreak of the Onin War, Onibaba also portrays an almost post-apocalyptic level of societal breakdown and moral degeneracy; as Kyoto was valued as Japan's capitol long before the rise of the city of Edo and the reestablishment of the Shogunate's power by Tokugawa Ieyasu, the violence and warfare of the Onin War eventually spread through out Kyoto itself, completely causing chaos and throwing Japan into turmoil because of its abandonment and desolation as Japan's center of politics, religion, and economics  into the twilight of the Nanbokucho era. Its reach of anarchy can be felt into the rural lives of the mother and daughter-in-law and their neighbors, lacking community to ensure moral guidance and direction, delving into wanton abandon as their lives become more of a struggle to survive and desolate of human interaction, and pushing them to go as far as to commit what would be heinous crimes and atrocities in more peaceful times, but has now been necessitated to be essential to surviving their meager and bleak times. Going back into its Buddhist themes, this is evocative of mappo or Japan's interpretation of Kali Yuga, which in Heian Era depictions, spoke of how demons from hell sent forth by King Enma would be unleashed upon the earth, and hunt eagerly for sinners, degenerates, and non-believers to throw into eternal damnation.

Cast
Most of the cast consisted of members of Shindo's regular group of performers, Nobuko Otowa, Kei Satō, Taiji Tonoyama, and Jūkichi Uno. This was Jitsuko Yoshimura's only appearance in a Shindo film. The two women do not have names even in the script, but are merely described as "middle-aged woman" and "young woman".

Nobuko Otowa as Older Woman
Jitsuko Yoshimura as Younger Woman
Kei Satō as Hachi
Taiji Tonoyama as Ushi
Jūkichi Uno as The Masked Warrior

Genre classification
Many critics have been divided on the genre of the film. While Onibaba is regarded a "period drama" by David Robinson, or "stage drama" by Japanese film scholar Keiko I. McDonald, Phil Hardy included it in his genre compendium as a horror film, and Chuck Stephens describes it as an erotic-horror classic. Writing for Sight & Sound, Michael Brooke noted that "Onibaba lasting greatness and undimmed potency lie in the fact that it works both as an unnervingly blunt horror film (and how!) and as a far more nuanced but nonetheless universal social critique that can easily be applied to an parallel situation".

Keiko I. McDonald stated that the film contained elements of the Noh theatre. She notes that the han'nya mask "is used to demonize the sinful emotions of jealousy and its associative emotions" in Noh plays, and that the differing camera angles at which the mask is filmed in Onibaba are similar to the way in which a Noh performer uses the angle of the mask to indicate emotions. Other reviewers also speculate about Noh influences on the film.

Production

She was punished by the mask sticking to her face, and when she begged to be allowed to remove it, she was able to take it off, but it took the flesh of her face with it.

Kaneto Shindo wanted to film Onibaba in a field of susuki grass. He sent out assistant directors to find suitable locations. Once a location was found near a river bank at Inba Swamp in Chiba Prefecture, they put up prefabricated buildings to live in. Filming started on June 30, 1964, and continued for three months. Shindo built things such as a makeshift turtle water slide to entertain the crew and keep things cool during harsh conditions of filming out in the fields of nowhere. The crew members were doing laundry and living in the fabricated buildings during the filming. The crew members grouping and eating together things like onigiri and soba noodles was caught on camera.

They had a rule that if somebody left they would not get any pay, to keep the crew motivated to continue. Shindo included dramatized scenes of the dissatisfaction on the set as part of the 2000 film By Player.

To film night scenes inside the huts, they would put up screens to block the sun, and changing the shot would require setting the screens in a completely different spot.

Kaneto Shindo said that the effects of the mask on those who wear it are symbolic of the disfigurement of the victims of the Atomic bombings of Hiroshima and Nagasaki, the film reflecting the traumatic effect of this visitation on post-war Japanese society.

A makeshift tower where crew members could climb to look down and film using crane shots was built. The tower was tall enough to get a look around the entire field.

The film contains some sequences filmed in slow motion.

The scenes of the older woman descending in to the hole had to be shot using an artificial "hole" built above ground with scaffolding, since holes dug in the ground at the location site would immediately fill with water.

Score
Onibaba score is by Shindo's long-term collaborator Hikaru Hayashi. The background and title music consists of Taiko drumming combined with jazz.

Release
Onibaba was released in Japan on November 21, 1964, where it was distributed by Toho. The film was released in the United States by Toho International with English subtitles on February 4, 1965. An English-dubbed version was produced by Toho, but any actual release of it is undetermined. On the film's initial theatrical release in the United Kingdom, the film was first rejected by the BBFC on its first submission, and then released in a heavily edited form after its second submission."

Home media
It was released as a Region 1 DVD on March 16, 2004, in the Criterion Collection. A Region 2 DVD was released in 2005 as part of the Masters of Cinema series.

Critical response
From contemporary reviews, the Monthly Film Bulletin observed that "Shindo obviously likes to milk his situations for all they are worth—and then some," noting that "Onibaba has the same striking surface as [Ningen and The Naked Island]," and that the film "has the same tendency to fall apart if examined too closely." The review praised Kuroda's "fine photography" but said that nothing else "in the film quite matches this opening among the reeds, or its aftermath in the ruthless stripping of the victims and disposal of their corpses, except perhaps the encounter between the old woman and the General." "Wear" of Variety described it as the "sexiest pic to be unveiled in New York so far," noting that Nobuko Otowa is superb as the older woman while Jitsuko Yoshimura contribs an excellent characterization as the daughter-in-law." The review declared it "sometimes high adventure and exciting, at other times dull in its so-called symbolism. Too often, this turns out to be a potpourri of ravenous eating and blatant sex." A. H. Weiler of The New York Times described the film's raw qualities as "neither new nor especially inventive to achieve his stark, occasionally shocking effects. Although his artistic integrity remains untarnished, his driven rustic principals are exotic, sometimes grotesque figures out of medieval Japan, to whom a Westerner finds it hard to relate." The review noted that Shindo's "symbolism, which undoubtedly is more of a treat to the Oriental than the Occidental eye and ear, may be oblique, but his approach to amour is direct... the tale is abetted by Hiyomi Kuroda's cloudy, low-key photography and Hikaru Kuroda's properly weird background musical score. But despite Mr. Shindo's obvious striving for elemental, timeless drama, it is simply sex that is the most impressive of the hungers depicted here."

Peter Bradshaw in The Guardian, writing in 2010, commented: "Onibaba is a chilling movie, a waking nightmare shot in icy monochrome, and filmed in a colossal and eerily beautiful wilderness." Jonathan Rosenbaum of The Chicago Reader described it as "creepy, interesting, and visually striking."

On review aggregator website Rotten Tomatoes, Onibaba received an approval rating of 89% based on 18 modern reviews, and an average rating of 7.20 out of 10.

See also
 Onibaba (folklore)

References

Bibliography

External links
 
 
 Onibaba at the Japanese Movie Database
 
 Kei Satō's 
Onibaba: Black Sun Rising an essay by Chuck Stephens at the Criterion Collection

1964 films
1964 horror films
Japanese drama films
Japanese horror films
Jidaigeki films
Japanese black-and-white films
1960s Japanese-language films
Japanese supernatural horror films
Existentialist films
Films set in the 14th century
Films directed by Kaneto Shindo
Films with screenplays by Kaneto Shindo
1960s historical horror films
Period horror films
1960s Japanese films